The Order of Hamondieh was a decoration of the Sultanate of Zanzibar.  The award was usually made in recognition of services rendered to the Sultan or state of Zanzibar.

It was awarded in the following order of precedence:

Grand Order
First Class
Second Class
Third Class
Fourth Class
Fifth Class.

Famous recipients
Lloyd Mathews - Grand Order
Arthur Raikes - First Class
Admiral Harry Rawson - Unknown class
Faisal bin Turki, Sultan of Muscat and Oman - First Class in brilliants

Other recipients
Alexander Stuart Rogers, First class, 1902

References 

Orders, decorations, and medals of the Sultanate of Zanzibar